Pothyne suturalis is a species of beetle in the family Cerambycidae. It was described by Pic in 1924.

References

suturalis
Beetles described in 1924